Jeffrey Robert Hammond (born March 12, 1980) is a Canadian actor and director. He has acted in Breakout Kings and Black Friday. Jeff also acted and directed segments for the project The Girls on Film.

Filmography

References

External links

Hammond Cheeze Films

1980 births
Canadian male film actors
Canadian male television actors
Living people
Male actors from Ontario
People from Leamington, Ontario